Gastón Gaudio was the defending champion, but lost in the quarterfinals to Agustín Calleri.

Calleri went on to win the title, defeating Juan Ignacio Chela 7–6(11–9), 6–2, 6–3 in the final.

Seeds

Draw

Finals

Top half

Section 1

Section 2

Bottom half

Section 3

Section 4

References

External links
 Main draw
 Qualifying draw

Austrian Open - Singles
Singles